Canthigaster rapaensis is a species of fish in the family Tetraodontidae. It is endemic to French Polynesia.

References

Fauna of French Polynesia
rapaensis
Taxa named by Gerald R. Allen
Taxa named by John Ernest Randall
Taxonomy articles created by Polbot
Fish described in 1977